Vladimir Dimitrov — Maystora (1 February 1882 – 29 September 1960), was a Bulgarian painter, draughtsman and teacher. He is considered one of the most talented 20th century Bulgarian painters and probably the most remarkable stylist in Bulgarian painting in the post-Russo-Turkish War era. His portraits and compositions have expressive and vivid color, idealistic quality of the image, profound symbolic strength and originality. The main topic which he explores is the relation between man and nature. Although he does not consider himself religious, he regards Nature as governed by a supreme spirit; he shares that the main purpose of his paintings is to elevate man and humanity, to bring it closer to harmony, represented by this omnipresent spirit.

Life and work
Vladimir Dimitrov was born in Frolosh, near Kyustendil and started his career as a clerk. In 1903 he enrolled in the School of Drawing in Sofia where he had been called the Master (Maystora) for the first time. In 1922 he met the American John Crane in Rome and sold him much of his work for the next few years.
In the period before and after the First World War he travelled extensively, visited Russia, Italy, France, Germany and the USA. After that he spent almost all of his life in the village of Shishkovtzi.

Vladimir Dimitrov is famous not solely because of his paintings but also because of his lifestyle. His family was poor but even after he became famous, he was trying to give away all of his possessions and money, living in poverty and asceticism, wearing old clothes, never shaving and eating only vegetarian food. This is the reason why even while alive, many people believed that he was a saint and showed great affection for him.

Vladimir Dimitrov was an outstanding artist who included bright colors within his art and today his artwork may be considered a fauvist type rather than expressionist. He uses a wide range of post-impressionist techniques, but his works always keep a strong bound with reality and try to simplify many of the figures and compositions to make them accessible for a wider public. The main expressive strength does not come from the clarity of the images but from the colors. More than 700 of his oil paintings are exhibited in the "Vladimir Dimitrov Art Gallery" in Kyustendil.

Maystora Peak on Greenwich Island in the South Shetland Islands, Antarctica is named for the painter.

Social engagement 
 1910-1920: paints in the traditional realistic style prevalent in Europe at the time. During this period (1912–1917), he participated as "war painter" in both the Balkan Wars and First World War. It is probably due to this war experience that he becomes imbued with the spirit of Tolstoyanism.
 1920-1930: creates the painting now called "The Bulgarian Madonna".
 1946: joins the Communist Party.

Notes

References

External links
Vladimir Dimitrov's Art
Domino: Art Galleries - Images of Dimitrovs paintings.

1882 births
1960 deaths
People from Kyustendil Province
20th-century Bulgarian painters
20th-century male artists
Male painters